Diyego Tengizovich Malaniya (born 11 February 1991) is a Russian professional association football player. He plays for FC Znamya Truda Orekhovo-Zuyevo.

Club career
He made his Russian Football National League debut for FC Khimki on 11 July 2016 in a game against FC Tosno.

External links

1991 births
People from Orekhovo-Zuyevo
Sportspeople from Moscow Oblast
Living people
Russian people of Abkhazian descent
Russian footballers
Association football defenders
FC Khimki players
FC Veles Moscow players
FC Volgar Astrakhan players
FC Znamya Truda Orekhovo-Zuyevo players
FC Olimp-Dolgoprudny players
FC Tekstilshchik Ivanovo players
Russian First League players
Russian Second League players